Aalfs is a surname. Notable people with the surname include:

 (1892–1970), Dutch teacher, filmmaker, and photographer
Janet Aalfs (born 1956), American poet and martial artist, daughter of Joann
Joann Aalfs (1923–2021), American women's rights and LGBTQ rights activist

See also
Ruijs-Aalfs syndrome